Frank John Butler (May 3, 1909October 30, 1979) was a professional American football offensive lineman in the  National Football League. He played four seasons for the Green Bay Packers.

1909 births
1979 deaths
Sportspeople from Bloomington, Illinois
Players of American football from Illinois
American football centers
American football offensive tackles
Michigan State Spartans football players
Green Bay Packers players